A column is a recurring piece or article in a newspaper, magazine or other publication, where a writer expresses their own opinion in few columns allotted to them by the newspaper organisation. Columns are written by columnists.

What differentiates a column from other forms of journalism is that it is a regular feature in a publication – written by the same writer or reporter and usually on the same subject area or theme each time – and that it typically, but not universally, contains the author's opinion or point of view. A column states an opinion. It is said to be like an open letter. A column also has a standard head, called a title, and a by-line (name) at the top.

Types 
Some types of newspaper columns are:

 Advice column
 Book review
 Cannabis column
 Community correspondent
 Critic's reviews
 Editorial opinion
 Fashion column
 Features column
 Food column
 Gossip column
 Humor column or causerie
 Music column
 Sports column
 Opinion column

Awards 
The Pulitzer Prize for Commentary is often awarded for commentary appearing in a column.

See also

References 

 
Magazine publishing
Newspaper content
Newspaper publishing
Opinion journalism
Writing